Pomerleau is a surname. Notable people with the surname include:

Donald Pomerleau (1915–1992), American police chief
Ovide F. Pomerleau (born 1940), American psychologist
René Pomerleau (1904–1993), Canadian mycologist and plant pathologist
Roger Pomerleau (born 1947), Canadian politician